Deh-e Mir (also Romanized as Deh-e Mīr and Deh Mīr) is a village in Zeydabad Rural District, in the Central District of Sirjan County, Kerman Province, Iran. At the 2006 census, its population was 18, in 4 families.

References 

Populated places in Sirjan County